Ackworth, North Elmsall and Upton is an electoral ward of the City of Wakefield district used for elections to Wakefield Metropolitan District Council.

Overview 
The ward is situated in the south east of the Wakefield district and is made up of a number of villages and hamlets set amongst farmland. The villages in the ward include Ackworth, North Elmsall and Upton, Badsworth, Thorpe Audlin, Low Ackworth and High Ackworth and part of Wentbridge. Landmarks include Nostell Priory.

Election results

References 

Wards of Wakefield